"Hide and Seek" was the third single by musician Howard Jones. It was released in February 1984, and reached number 12 in the UK Singles Chart. It appears on Jones' album Human's Lib. Musically, the song is darker than other songs by Jones, featuring an eerie gothic-tinged sound that is comparable to dark ambient.

The B-sides, "Tao Te Ching" and "China Dance", are both instrumentals.  All tracks were written by Jones.

Jones performed a solo acoustic version of the song at the 1985 Live Aid benefit concert.
The track reached the top 5 in many countries including Ireland and has been covered by many artists, including a version by the band Gregorian on their fourth Masters of Chant album.

The theme of the song, is the story of the origin of the universe according to Buddhist, Advaita Vedanta (Hinduism) and other Eastern ontological philosophies. The original being manifests the universe and then 'loses' him/herself (Jones uses both, to defeat the duality of gender) in the creation, as part of a game of hide and seek, with the goal of life being to discover that one is nothing other than the original primordial being.

A re-recorded, longer version of the song was released on the album Perform.00 in 2000.

Track listing
7"
"Hide & Seek" – 4:49
"Tao Te Ching" – 3:52

12"
"Hide & Seek (Long Version)" – 8:30
"Tao Te Ching" – 3:52
"China Dance" – 3:50

Limited Edition 10"
"Hide & Seek (Concert Version)"
"Hide & Seek" – 4:49
"Tao Te Ching" – 3:52

A limited edition 10" picture disc was also released in the UK.

Charts

Year-end charts

References

External links
The Official Howard Jones Website Discography

1984 singles
Howard Jones (English musician) songs
Songs written by Howard Jones (English musician)
1984 songs
Song recordings produced by Rupert Hine
Warner Music Group singles